Kathleen Souza (born November 18, 1939) is an American politician in the state of New Hampshire. She is a member of the New Hampshire House of Representatives, sitting as a Republican from the Hillsborough 43 district, having been first elected in 2010. She previously served from 2000–2006.

References

1939 births
Living people
Fisher College alumni
Members of the New Hampshire House of Representatives
Suffolk University alumni